Danske Bank, formerly Östgöta Enskilda Bank, is a Swedish commercial bank which is owned by Danske Bank.

History
The bank was founded in 1837 as Öst-Götha-Bank in Linköping. The bishop Johan Jacob Hedrén was bank director. In 1846 it changed name to Östgötha Enskilda Bank and in 1856 to Östergötlands Enskilda Bank.

The bank in Kisa, Östergötland was robbed on 28 May 1999 and with police in pursuit the robbers killed two policemen, see Malexander murders. 

The banks in Stockholm and Östergötland County were called "Östgöta Enskilda Bank" until 2011, when they changed their name to "Danske Bank".

Provincial banks
The banking license is held by Östgöta Enskilda Bank, but it uses different brand names in various parts of the country, typically named after the historical Provinces or Counties of Sweden.

Bohusbanken (in Bohuslän and Gothenburg)
Gävleborgs Provinsbank (in Gävle)
Hallands Provinsbank (in Halland)
Närkes Provinsbank (in Närke)
Skånes Provinsbank (in Skåne)
Smålandsbanken (in Småland)
Sundsvallsbanken (in Sundsvall)
Sörmlands Provinsbank (in Södermanland)
Upplandsbanken (in Uppland)
Värmlands Provinsbank (in Värmland)
Västmanlands Provinsbank (in Västmanland)
Älvsborgs Provinsbank (in Älvsborg County)
Östgöta Enskilda Bank (in Östergötland and Stockholm)

Sources

Östgöta Enskilda Bank byter namn (the change of name from Östgöta Enskilda Bank to Danske Bank)
OAB logos - a web page showing the logos of OAB.

References

Defunct banks of Sweden
Banks established in 1837
Banks disestablished in 1997
Sweden
Swedish companies established in 1837
Swedish companies disestablished in 1997